Bradbury Fill is one of the embankments on the Lackawanna Cut-Off railroad line in northwest New Jersey. It was built in 1908–11 by Waltz & Reece Construction Company and sits between mileposts 49.1 and 49.8 in Byram Township, just west of Waltz & Reece Cut and east of Lubber Run Fill.

It is made of 457,000 cubic yards of fill material obtained by dynamite blasting and other methods. It carries a 2° curve that permits .

Abandoned in 1983, the line is to be reactivated as a single-track line by NJ Transit in 2026.

Bradbury Fill is named for Mrs. Delia R. Bradbury, who had owned most of the land used for the fill.

References 

Lackawanna Cut-Off